Moucheron is the French word for gnat. It can also refer to:
 Balthazar de Moucheron: a merchant from Antwerp on Russia, Levant, Africa, Ceylon, and the Caribbean, who founded a trading company before the establishment of the Dutch East India Company.
 Frederik de Moucheron (Emden 1633 - Amsterdam 1686) : a Dutch Italian landscapes painter in the list of people from the Dutch Golden Age or in the list of Dutch painters.
 Isaac de Moucheron
 Hendrik de Moucheron : a family name in the list of Swedish noble families.

 Moucheron : a horse winning the Irish 1,000 Guineas in 1928.
 "Lucia the Moucheron", an opera by Flairck first released in 2002.
 Moucheron : a boat part of the List of Royal Navy ships.
 [Mam'zelle] Moucheron : an operette by Jacques Offenbach.
 LE LION ET LE MOUCHERON. 1932 - The Lion and the Fly : a film by Ladislas Starevich.
 , a French privateer that  captured in 1801 and that disappeared without a trace in the Mediterranean in 1807.